Daniel "Danny" Sullivan (born May 31, 1947) is a Canadian former ice hockey goaltender who played in the World Hockey Association (WHA) for the Philadelphia Blazers and the Vancouver Blazers.

Career 
In his WHA career, Sullivan appeared in two games. He won his Philadelphia start, defeating the Los Angeles Sharks 4–3 on November 11, 1972. On March 21, 1974 he lost his only start with the Vancouver Blazers 7–1 to the New England Whalers.

References

External links

1947 births
Living people
Canadian ice hockey goaltenders
Charlotte Checkers (SHL) players
Dayton Gems players
Ice hockey people from British Columbia
Roanoke Valley Rebels (EHL) players
Roanoke Valley Rebels (SHL) players
Vancouver Blazers players
Winston-Salem Polar Twins (SHL) players